Takhte Soleyman or Takht-e Suleyman is a mountain in the Takht-e Suleyman Massif, Alborz mountain range, north of Iran.

Takhte Soleyman means Solomon's Throne (seat). Takhte Soleyman is a prominent peak that rises to the north of the 4850 m Alam Kuh Peak which is the highest point of the Takht-e Suleyman Massif. It dominates the view from the popular Sarchal Shelter.

Takhte Soleyman is a very rugged peak whose slopes are covered by cliffs/needles many of which can be thought of as sub-peaks. Despite this, the main route to the summit is non-technical through a boulder/scree covered area to the south.

See also
 List of Iranian four-thousanders

References

Takht-e Suleyman
Mountains of Mazandaran Province
Mountaineering in Iran